Charles Robert Scrivener  (2 November 1855 – 26 September 1923) was an Australian surveyor, and the person who surveyed numerous sites in New South Wales for the selection of a site for the Australian Capital Territory and Australia's capital city, Canberra.

Scrivener was born in Windsor, New South Wales. In 1876, he was employed by the New South Wales Department of Lands. He was apprenticed as a surveyor between 1877 and 1879. On 9 July 1880, the government gazette announced that he had been licensed as a surveyor by the Surveyor-General. In 1888, Scrivener was appointed Surveyor in Maitland, New South Wales, by 1896 he was appointed as an Acting District Surveyor in Wagga Wagga and District Surveyor for Hay in 1906. He surveyed numerous sites for the construction of Australia's capital, including Buckley's Crossing, the Hay district, and lastly the Yass-Canberra district. Scrivener's contour map of the selected site was used as the basis for entries in the Canberra design competition. He was appointed first director of Commonwealth lands and surveys in 1910 and retired in 1915. He died aged 67 in Killara, New South Wales.

The Scrivener Dam on Lake Burley Griffin is named in his honour.

References

Further reading 
 

Australian surveyors
Australian Companions of the Imperial Service Order
1855 births
1923 deaths
Australian public servants
Public servants of New South Wales